Protestants in India are a minority and a sub-section of Christians in India and also to a certain extent the Christians in Pakistan before the Partition of India, that adhere to some or all of the doctrines of Protestantism. Protestants in India are a small minority in a predominantly Hindu majority country, but form majorities in the north-eastern states of Meghalaya, Mizoram& Nagaland and significant minorities in Konkan division, Bengal, Kerala& Tamil Nadu, with various communities in east coast and northern states. Protestants today trace their heritage back to the Protestant reformation of the 16th century.

History

Colonial India

As the Anglican Church was the established church of England, "it had an impact on India with the arrival of the British". Citing the Great Commission, Joseph White, a Laudian Professor of Arabic at the University of Oxford, "preached before the university in 1784 on the duty of promoting the universal and progressive message of Christianity 'among our Mahometan and Gentoo Subjects in India'." In 1889, the Prime Minister of Great Britain, Robert Gascoyne-Cecil, 3rd Marquess of Salisbury expressed similar sentiments, stating that "It is not only our duty but is in our interest to promote the diffusion of Christianity as far as possible throughout the length and breadth of India."

The growth of the British Indian Army led to the arrival of many Anglican chaplains in India. Following the arrival of the Church of England's Church Mission Society in 1814, the Diocese of Calcutta of the Church of India, Burma and Ceylon (CIBC) was erected, with its St. Paul's Cathedral being built in 1847. By 1930, the Church of India, Burma and Ceylon had fourteen dioceses across the Indian Empire.

Missionaries from other Christian denominations came to British India as well; Lutheran missionaries, for example, arrived in Calcutta in 1836 and by "the year 1880 there were over 31,200 Lutheran Christians spread out in 1,052 villages". Methodists began arriving in India in 1783 and established missions with a focus on "education, health ministry, and evangelism". In the 1790s, Christians from the London Missionary Society and Baptist Missionary Society, began doing missionary work in the Indian Empire. In Neyoor, the London Missionary Society Hospital "pioneered improvements in the public health system for the treatment of diseases even before organized attempts were made by the colonial Madras Presidency, reducing the death rate substantially".

After 1857, the establishment of schools and hospitals by British Christian missionaries became the "a pivotal feature of missionary work and the principal vehicles for conversion". Christ Church College (1866) and St. Stephen's College (1881) are two examples of prominent church-affiliated educational institutions founded during the colonial period India. Within educational institutions established during the British Raj in India, Christian texts, especially the Bible, were a part of the curricula. During the colonial era in India, Christian missionaries developed writing systems for Indian languages that previously did not have one. Christian missionaries in India also worked to increase literacy and also engaged in social activism, such as fighting against prostitution, championing the right of widowed women to remarry, and trying to stop early marriages for women. Among British women, zenana missions became a popular method to win converts to Christianity.

In colonial India, the All India Conference of Indian Christians (AICIC) played an important role in the Indian independence movement, advocating for swaraj and opposing the partition of India. The AICIC also was opposed to separate electorates for Christians, believing that the faithful "should participate as common citizens in one common, national political system". The All India Conference of Indian Christians and the All India Catholic Union formed a working committee with M. Rahnasamy of Andhra University serving as President and B.L. Rallia Ram of Lahore serving as General Secretary; in its meeting on 16 April 1947 and 17 April 1947, the joint committee prepared a 13 point memorandum that was sent to the Constituent Assembly of India, which asked for religious freedom for both organisations and individuals; this came to be reflected in the Constitution of India.

Independent India

Many Protestant denominations are represented in India, the result of missionary activities throughout the country especially under British rule in India. The largest Protestant denomination in the country is the Church of South India, since 1947 a union of Presbyterian, Reformed, Congregational, Methodist, and Anglican congregations with approximately 4 million members as of 2014. The broadly similar Church of North India had 1 million members. (Both churches are in full communion with the Anglican Communion.) There were about 1.3 million Lutherans, 473,000 Methodists, and 425,000 Baptists as of 1995.

Pentecostalism, one of the largest Protestant denominations worldwide, is also a rapidly growing denomination in India. It is spreading greatly in northern India and the southwestern areas, such as Kerala. The largest indigenous Pentecostal denominations in India are The Pentecostal Mission (TPM) and the India Pentecostal Church of God (IPC).

As for the smaller denominations, another prominent group is the Brethren. They include Plymouth Brethren, Indian Brethren, Kerala Brethren etc. The Conference of the Mennonite Brethren Churches in India has more than 100,000 members.

One of the oldest denominations meanwhile is the Northern Evangelical Lutheran Church.

Notable missionaries 
Protestant missionaries began to work throughout India, leading to the growth of different Christian communities. In 1793, William Carey, an English Baptist Minister, came to India as a missionary. He worked in Serampore, Calcutta and other cities founding churches. On the educational front, in addition to starting the Serampore College, he also translated the Bible into Bengali and Sanskrit, continuing with these labours until his death in 1834.
According to the chronicler Otto of Freising, Arnold had studied in Paris under the tutelage of the reformer and philosopher Pierre Abélard. He took to Abélard's philosophy of reform ways. Anthony Norris Groves, Plymouth Brethren missionary came to India in 1833. He worked in the Godavari delta area of then Madras Presidency, until his death in 1852.

Protestant Churches in India 

 Assemblies of God in India
Ao Baptist Arogo Mungdang (Ao Baptist Churches Convention)
Apatani Christian Fellowship
Assam Baptist Convention
Baptist Christian Association
Baptist Church of Mizoram
Baptist Union of North India
Basel Mission
Bengal Baptist Fellowship
Bengal Orissa Bihar Baptist Convention.                                     
Council of Baptist Churches in Northern India
Congregational Church in India
Church of North India
Church of South India
Evangelical Baptist Convention of India
Evangelical Church of Maraland.                                                            
Garo Baptist Convention
Gospel Association of India
India Association of General Baptists
India Evangelical Lutheran Church IELC
Evangelical Church of India
Karbi Anglong Baptist Convention
Karnataka Baptist Convention
Lower Assam Baptist Union
Maharashtra Baptist Society
Manipur Baptist Convention
Mao Baptist Church
Nagaland Baptist Church Council
North Bank Baptist Christian Association
Orissa Baptist Evangelical Crusade
Poumai Baptist Church
Presbyterian Church in India
Presbyterian Church in India (Reformed)
Presbyterian Free Church of Central India
Rabha Baptist Church Union
Reformed Presbyterian Church of India
Reformed Presbyterian Church North East India
Presbyterian Church of South India
Samavesam of Telugu Baptist Churches
Separate Baptists in Christ
Sumi Baptist Church
Southern Asia Division of Seventh-day Adventists
Seventh Day Baptist Church
The Pentecostal Mission (formerly Ceylon Pentecostal Mission)
Mar Thoma Church
Tamil Baptist Churches
Tamil Evangelical Lutheran Church
Tirunelveli C.M.S. Evangelical Church
Tripura Baptist Christian Union
United Church of Northern India – Presbyterian Synod
Indian Pentecostal Church of God

Source of the list: World Christian Encyclopedia.

See also 

Baptists in India
Anglicans in India
Seventh-day Adventist Church in India

References

 
India